R369 road may refer to:
 R369 road (Ireland)
 R369 road (South Africa)